The Sacro Monte di Orta (literally: "Sacred Mountain of Orta") is a Roman Catholic devotional complex in the comune of Orta San Giulio (Piedmont, northern Italy) on the summit of a hill known as San Nicolao, which faces the western shore of Lake Orta. It is one of the Sacri Monti of Piedmont and Lombardy, included in UNESCO World Heritage list.

It is a stop-over on the CoEur devotional path.

Many of the artworks are of a high quality, some of the most highly thought of painters and sculptors of the period having been commissioned to produce them. The vegetation of the Sacred Mountain runs down to the shores of Lake Orta and was designed in line with ornamental criteria to match the architecture.

History
Construction of the complex, dedicated to St. Francis of Assisi, began in 1583. The project by the Capuchin friar Cleto da Castelletto Ticino involved 36 chapels, of which only 20 were built. Until 1630 they were mostly in the Mannerist style, but from the mid-17th century, Baroque and other influences predominated. Construction ended in 1788.

References

External links

Sacro Monte di Orta 
Official web site for European Sacred Mounts All information relative to Sacri Monti in Piedmont and Lombardy is available in Italian and English.
More than 130 images across the chapels;
https://punctumbooks.com/titles/sacred-views-of-saint-francis-the-sacro-monte-di-orta/

Buildings and structures in Orta San Giulio
World Heritage Sites in Italy
Orta
Tourist attractions in Piedmont